Rutledge is an unincorporated community located in the town of Jamestown, Grant County, Wisconsin, United States.

Notes

Unincorporated communities in Grant County, Wisconsin
Unincorporated communities in Wisconsin